Sagalassa robusta is a moth in the family Brachodidae. It is found in Brazil.

References

Natural History Museum Lepidoptera generic names catalog

Brachodidae
Moths described in 1856